Vincy Barretto (born 8 December 1999), is an Indian professional footballer who plays as a winger for Indian Super League club Chennaiyin.

Club career

Early life and career 
Born in Goa, India, Barretto did his youth career at the academy of Dempo SC where he featured for the club in the under-18 division.

FC Goa Reserves 
Barretto signed his first senior contract with reserve team of Indian Super League side FC Goa in 2017. He was drafted for the first team for the 2018–19 Goa Professional League, which they emerged as champions. He also featured for them in seventeen different occasions in the domestic league and nine times in the I-League 2nd Division in the 2018–19 season. He left the team after the 2019–20 season, after he materialised a contract after a successful trial with I-League club Gokulam Kerala.

Gokulam Kerala FC 
Barretto signed for I-League club Gokulam Kerala in 2020. He played his debut match for the club in the club's first match of season against Chennai City FC on 9 January 2021 as a starter in lineup, which ended 1–2 to Chennai City. He made thirteen appearances for the club and won the 2020–21 I-League title with the club.

Kerala Blasters
On 8 July 2021, Indian Super League club Kerala Blasters announced the signing of Barretto by paying an undisclosed transfer fee on a three-year deal. He made his debut for the club on 11 September 2021 against Indian Navy in the 2021 Durand Cup, which they won 1–0. Barretto made his ISL debut in the 2021–22 Indian Super League season match on 25 November 2021 against NorthEast United FC, which ended up in a goalless draw. On 23 February 2022, he scored his first career debut goal with the Blasters through a volley from outside the box in their 2–1 defeat to Hyderabad FC. He scored his second goal, again as a substitute against FC Goa on 7 March, which ended in a high-scoring 4–4 draw.

Career statistics

Club

Honours

Club

FC Goa Reserves
 Goa Professional League: 2018–19

Gokulam Kerala FC
 I-League: 2020–21
Kerala Blasters FC

 Indian Super League runner up: 2021–22.

References

External links 

 
 
 

1999 births
Living people
People from Goa
Indian footballers
Gokulam Kerala FC players
Association football midfielders
Footballers from Goa
I-League players
I-League 2nd Division players
Goa Professional League players
Kerala Blasters FC players
Kerala Blasters FC Reserves and Academy players
Indian Super League players
Chennaiyin FC players